The Carleton Place Canadians are a junior ice hockey team based in Carleton Place, Ontario, Canada.  The Canadians are members of the Central Canada Hockey League and Canadian Junior Hockey League, and as such are eligible for the Eastern Canadian Fred Page Cup championship and Royal Bank Cup National championship.

History
The Carleton Place Kings began play in 1969 in the Renfrew-Lanark Junior C Hockey League.  Soon after, the league folded and the Kings ended up in the Rideau-St. Lawrence Junior B Hockey League in 1971.  This league later became the Eastern Ontario Junior Hockey League.  In 2009 it was announced that the team had been granted expansion to the Central Junior A Hockey League.  Although the CJHL franchise has a different name, the Legion Kings are still considered the forerunner to the Canadians franchise.

The Canadians played their first Junior A game on September 11, 2009.  At home, the Canadians dropped a 4-1 decision to the Nepean Raiders.  On September 13, 2009, the Canadians won their first ever CJHL game, defeating the Ottawa Jr. Senators 3–2 in a shootout on the road.

The 2013–14 season was a landmark season for the Canadians.  They shattered both the CCHL's wins and points records en route to their first regular season title, falling one win short of shattering the 1972-73 Pembroke Lumber Kings league record for best winning percentage (47-4-4). They won CCHL playoffs by beating the Kemptville 73s 4–0. Than the beat Pembroke in a hard-fought 7-game series. In the final, they won their first CCHL  Art Bogart Cup against their division rival smith falls bears in 5 games in 2OT. In the fred page cup they went on to win the fred page against the St Jerome Panthers 3–1 to win their 1st Fred Page Page. the Canadiens lost in RBC cup final in a 2ot lost to the Yorkton Terriers.

Season-by-season results

Fred Page Cup 
Eastern Canada Championships
MHL - QAAAJHL - CCHL - Host
Round robin play with 2nd vs 3rd in semi-final to advance against 1st in the finals.

Royal Bank Cup
CANADIAN NATIONAL CHAMPIONSHIPS
Dudley Hewitt Champions - Central, Fred Page Champions - Eastern, Western Canada Cup Champions - Western, Western Canada Cup - Runners Up and Host
Round robin play with top 4 in semi-final and winners to finals.

References

External links
Carleton Place Canadians

Central Canada Hockey League teams
Ice hockey teams in Ottawa
Carleton Place
Ice hockey clubs established in 1969
1969 establishments in Ontario